Peter Simonischek (born 6 August 1946) is an Austrian actor. He is a celebrated stage performer and has been a regular ensemble member of the Burgtheater since 1999. He often appears at the Salzburg Festival and has played the title role in the play Jedermann numerous times.

In addition, he has also appeared in more than sixty films since 1980. Simonischek is perhaps best-known to international audiences for his leading role in the critically acclaimed comedy-drama Toni Erdmann (2016).

He grew up in Markt Hartmannsdorf, a municipality in the state of Styria, where his father was a dentist. His son, Max Simonischek, is also an actor.

Selected filmography

References

External links 

1946 births
20th-century Austrian male actors
21st-century Austrian male actors
Living people
Austrian male film actors
Austrian male television actors
European Film Award for Best Actor winners
Actors from Graz